Thomas H. Burns (1879 – November 14, 1913) was a Canadian jockey in the sport of Thoroughbred horse racing who competed successfully in Canada, the United States, and in Europe. He was two-time North American Champion and a U.S. Racing Hall of Fame inductee in 1983 and a 2011 Legends inductee in the Canadian Horse Racing Hall of Fame.

Career
Tommy Burns won his first race at age 16 at a racetrack in Hamilton, Ontario. His success in Canada led to riding in the United States where he got his first win in 1894 at a track in St. Paul, Minnesota.

Personal life
Tommy Burns married Roslyn Dorothy McLaughlin, daughter of another U.S. Hall of Fame jockey Jim McLaughlin. Roslyn McLaughlin had previously been married to Richard Clawson, another outstanding young jockey but he too had died young from Consumption.

References

1879 births
1913 deaths
Canadian jockeys
American jockeys
American Champion jockeys
United States Thoroughbred Racing Hall of Fame inductees
Canadian Horse Racing Hall of Fame inductees
People from Chatham-Kent
Burials at Holy Cross Cemetery, Brooklyn